Campbell Hausfeld is a manufacturer of consumer, industrial, and commercial grade, low priced air compressors and related products, based in Harrison, Ohio. It is a major subsidiary of the Marmon Group which in turn is part of Berkshire Hathaway. It is one of the oldest companies in Ohio.

History
The company was founded in 1836 and manufactured farm equipment. In 1940 it acquired Joseph Hausfeld's company which was the manufacturer of an air-compressor called Pressure King and was renamed Campbell-Hausfeld.  In 1971 Campbell Hausfeld was acquired by Scott Fetzer. In 2015 the company was acquired by The Marmon Group. The company also manufactures air tools, painting systems, winches, generators, pressure washers, and spray guns.

References

External links
D & B business rankings Author Dun and Bradstreet, Inc. Publisher Dun & Bradstreet, Inc. 1998 , 

Berkshire Hathaway
1836 establishments in Ohio
Manufacturing companies based in Cincinnati
Manufacturing companies established in 1836
American companies established in 1836
Goods manufactured in the United States